Gilpin is a surname, and may refer to:

 Betty Gilpin (born 1986), American actress
 Bernard Gilpin (1517–1583), English theologian influential in the emerging Church of England
 Charles Gilpin, multiple people
 Diane Gilpin, developing shipping that uses sustainable energy sources
 George Gilpin (1514–1602), English diplomat and one of Queen Elizabeth I's most trusted agents
 Harry Gilpin (1876–1950), British politician and businessman
 Henry D. Gilpin (1801–1860), American lawyer and Attorney General of the United States, son of Joshua Gilpin
 Jack Gilpin (born 1951), American actor
 John Gilpin, 18th century person who was the basis for William Cowper's ballad The Diverting History of John Gilpin 
 John Gilpin (dancer) (1930–1983), English ballet dancer and actor
 Joshua Gilpin (1765–1840) American paper manufacturer
 Laura Gilpin (1891–1979), American photographer
 Peri Gilpin (born 1961), American actress best known for her work on the television show Frasier
 Sir Richard Gilpin, 1st Baronet (1801–1882), MP for the Bedfordshire Constituency 
 Richard Gilpin (1625–1700), English nonconformist minister and physician
 Robert Gilpin, American economist, political scientist and professor
 Sally Gilpin, English ballet dancer and choreographer
 Sawrey Gilpin (1733–1807), English animal painter, illustrator and etcher
 Steve Gilpin (1950–1992), New Zealand singer
 William Gilpin (bishop) (1902–1988), Anglican Bishop of Kingston upon Thames
 William Gilpin (governor) (1813–1894), American explorer, politician, land speculator, soldier and writer, son of Joshua Gilpin
 William Gilpin (priest) (1724–1804, English artist, Anglican cleric, schoolmaster and author, best known as one of the originators of the idea of the picturesque
 William Sawrey Gilpin (1762–1843), English artist, drawing master and landscape designer

de:Gilpin
fr:Gilpin
pl:Gilpin